Lochalsh station is a Via Rail flag stop station located in Lochalsh, Ontario on the Sudbury – White River train.

External links
Via Rail page for Lochalsh train station

Via Rail stations in Ontario
Railway stations in Algoma District